Harry Cox (1885–1971) was an English singer.

Harry Cox may also refer to:

Harry Cox (politician) (1874–1950), Canadian politician
Harry Cox (footballer) (1884–1946), Australian footballer
Harry Cox, character in Big Money Hustlas
"Happy" Harry Cox, character in Everything You Know Is Wrong

See also
Henry Cox (disambiguation)
Harold Cox (disambiguation)